Liza del Mundo (born March 8, 1975) is an American voice actress. Her daughter Vivian Vencer is also a voice actress.

Early life
She was raised in the Rancho Penasquitos neighborhood of San Diego, California.

In 1993,  Del Mundo graduated from Mount Carmel High School where she wrote for the school newspaper and participated in student government.  She went on to study communications at Cal State Northridge.

Career
She worked for the Disney Channel as a voice host, notably in Toon Town Kids, and has been featured in several television commercials. Among her notable voices are Wendy in Danger Rangers, Polaris in Wolverine and the X-Men, Hay Lin in W.I.T.C.H and Laura, Andy's mother, on Maya & Miguel. She also portrayed as the titular role Imelda Marcos in Imelda: A New Musical.

References

External links

1975 births
Living people
Actresses from San Diego
American actresses of Filipino descent
American voice actresses
California State University, Northridge alumni
21st-century American women